Mount Chief Pascall is a  mountain summit located in the Joffre Group of the Lillooet Ranges, in southwestern British Columbia, Canada. Cayoosh Pass lies immediately northwest of the mountain, with Cayoosh Mountain on the opposite side of the pass. Its nearest higher peak is Joffre Peak,  to the south, and Mount Rohr rises  to the northeast. Precipitation runoff from the peak drains into tributaries of Cayoosh Creek.

The mountain's name was submitted by Karl Ricker of the Alpine Club of Canada to honor Chief Bill Pascall, an early leader of the Lillooet Band. The toponym was officially adopted on January 23, 1979, by the Geographical Names Board of Canada.

Climate

Based on the Köppen climate classification, Mount Chief Pascall is located in a subarctic climate zone of western North America. Most weather fronts originate in the Pacific Ocean, and travel east toward the Coast Mountains where they are forced upward by the range (Orographic lift), causing them to drop their moisture in the form of rain or snowfall. As a result, the Coast Mountains experience high precipitation, especially during the winter months in the form of snowfall. Winter temperatures can drop below −20 °C with wind chill factors below −30 °C. The months July through September offer the most favorable weather for climbing Mount Chief Pascall.

See also

 Geography of British Columbia
 Geology of British Columbia

References

External links
 Weather forecast: Mount Chief Pascall
 Climbing Mount Chief Pascall in winter: YouTube

Two-thousanders of British Columbia
Lillooet Ranges